Aílton Delfino (born 1 September 1968) is a retired Brazilian professional footballer who played as a striker.

Career
Born in Belo Horizonte, Aílton is a youth product of Atlético Mineiro, making his debut in 1987, and taking part in the conquest of three Campeonato Mineiro, in 1988, 1989 and 1991, and one Copa CONMEBOL.

In 1993, Aílton joined Benfica, as the alternative for Adolfo Valencia after negotiations with the Colombian failed. He made his debut on a friendly against FC Barcelona on 18 August 1993, scoring the 2–1 in the 73rd minute. His first season in Portugal was a success, as he help the Lisbon-side win the league title, scoring 14 goals in 33 games, notably the first against Porto on 6 February 1994.

In his second season, Artur Jorge made several changes in the squad, with Aílton being loaned out to São Paulo until June 1995. He returned to Portugal for a six-month spell in 1995, without much success, moving permanently to São Paulo in January 1996.

At São Paulo, he won the Copa Master de CONMEBOL, scoring one goal in the semifinal against Botafogo. He then passed through five more clubs, notably helping São Caetano finish runner-up in the Série A in 2000 and 2001, plus starting both games of the 2002 Copa Libertadores Finals.

Honours 
Atlético Mineiro
 Campeonato Mineiro: 1988, 1989, 1991
 Copa CONMEBOL: 1992

Benfica
 Primeira Liga: 1993–94
 Taça de Portugal: 1995–96

São Paulo
 Copa Master de CONMEBOL

References

External links

1968 births
Living people
Footballers from Belo Horizonte
Brazilian footballers
Association football forwards
Atlético Minero footballers
S.L. Benfica footballers
São Paulo FC players
Cruzeiro Esporte Clube players
Associação Portuguesa de Desportos players
Associação Desportiva São Caetano players
Esporte Clube Santo André players
América Futebol Clube (MG) players
Expatriate footballers in Portugal
Campeonato Brasileiro Série A players
Primeira Liga players
Campeonato Brasileiro Série B players